The 2015 SaskTel Tankard, the provincial men's curling championship for Saskatchewan, was held from February 4 to 8 at the Horizon Credit Union Centre in Melville. The winning Steve Laycock team represented Saskatchewan at the 2015 Tim Hortons Brier in Calgary.

Teams
The teams are listed as follows:

Knockout Draw Brackets

A Event

B Event

C Event

Playoffs

1 vs. 2
Saturday, February 7, 7:00 pm

3 vs. 4
Saturday, February 7, 7:00 pm

Semifinal
Sunday, February 8, 9:30 am

Final
Sunday, February 8, 2:00 pm

References

2015 Tim Hortons Brier
Curling in Saskatchewan
February 2015 sports events in Canada
2015 in Saskatchewan